Beside Myself is the fourth studio album by English alternative rock band Basement. It was released on 12 October 2018 and is their first album to be released by Fueled by Ramen. The album was co-produced by Colin Brittain and the band themselves, engineered by Alex Prieto, and was mixed by Rich Costey.

Release
In May, the group embarked on a co-headlining US tour with Citizen; they were supported by Pronoun and Souvenirs. On 1 August, Beside Myself was announced for release in October. Alongside this, "Disconnect" was released as its lead single; its accompanying music video was directed by Adam Powell. A second single, "Stigmata", was released on 7 September. A third single, "Be Here Now", was premiered on Billboards website on 2 October 2018. On 11 October, a music video was released for the track, directed by Mason Mercer.

Beside Myself was released on 12 October through Fueled by Ramen. Following this, the band went on a two-week US tour, with support from Elder Brother and Pllush. In November, they went on a headlining UK tour, with support from Joyce Manor. In April 2019, "Be Here Now" was released on 7" vinyl, with the outtake "Are You the One" as the B-side, as part of Record Store Day. During this month, the band went on an Australian tour with the Story So Far. Following this, the group went on a US tour with Nothing, Gouge Away and Teenage Wrist.

Track listing
All songs written by Basement.

Personnel
Basement
James Fisher – drums
Andrew Fisher – lead vocals
Alex Henery – guitar, backing vocals
Ronan Crix – lead guitarist
Duncan Stewart – bass

Additional personnel
Colin Brittain – production
Rich Costey – mixing
Alex Prieto - engineer/additional production

References
Citations

Sources

 

2018 albums
Basement (band) albums
Fueled by Ramen albums
Albums produced by Colin Brittain